Stadion RKS Garbarnia is a football stadium in Kraków, Poland.

Opened in 1990, it features two grass pitches and an artificial turf ground. It has around 1,000 seat capacity.

All teams except Poland national amputee football team played their matches at the 2021 European Amputee Football Championship in this stadium.

References

Buildings and structures in Kraków
Kraków
Sport in Kraków
Sports venues completed in 1990
1990 establishments in Poland